Don Johnson Big Band is an alternative hip hop group from Helsinki, Finland. Their music blends influences from a variety of genres such as electronic music, funk, rock, jazz and hip hop.

History 
The name "Don Johnson Big Band" comes from the actor Don Johnson in the series Miami Vice. The band had to come up with a name to reserve a place for training.

Members 
Don Johnson Big Band consists of four people: Tommy Lindgren (vocals), Kari Saarilahti (guitar), Johannes Laiho (keyboards) and Pekka Mikkonen (horns). Despite their name, they are not a big band, but instead a mix between rap, hip hop, techno, jazz, blues and rock. Regular featuring artists on DJBB gigs and albums are Juuso Hannukainen (percussion), Tero Rantanen (percussion), Emma Salokoski (vocals), and Teppo Mäkynen (turntables).

Discography

Albums
Support de Microphones (2000)
Breaking Daylight (2003)
Don Johnson Big Band (2006)
Records Are Forever (2009)
Fiesta (2012)
Physical Digital (2018)
Digital Physical (2022)

Singles

Trivia
Lindgren, Saarilahti and Laiho are old high school friends. Mikkonen joined in later.
Their 2009 album includes a song dedicated to Usain Bolt, titled Running Man.

References

External links
 The Official Don Johnson Big Band Website
 The Official Don Johnson Big Band Webshop (Worldwide)
 The Official Microsite of "Breaking Daylight" (Album, 2003)
 The Official Microsite of "Don Johnson Big Band" (Album, 2006)
 The Official Microsite of "Records Are Forever" (Album, 2009)
 Don Johnson Big Band on YouTube.com
 Don Johnson Big Band on Twitter.com

Finnish hip hop groups
Finnish electronic music groups